Kukasvada also sometimes spelled Kukaswada is a village in Malia tehsil of Junagadh district in Gujarat state of India. Kukasvada is the birth place of Dhirubhai Ambani and his close friend Bhikhabhai Bhadaraka known as Bhikha Bapa.

Education

College 
 Shri Karmyogi Arts And Comm. college Gadu

Schools 
 Sharda Pra Shala Pvt
 Vivekanand Pra Shala Pvt
 Kukasvada Kanya Shala
 Dholivav Sim Shala
 Kukasvada Pay Cen Shala

Health centre 
 C.M.Z.H. Junagardh, Civil Hospital, near Azad Chowk, near Azad Chowk
 Sargavada, Subcenter Saragwada, near bus station Saragwada
 Sub Center Balapur

Religious places 
 Bhikha Bapa temple, Kukasvada
 Jay Charan Ma Jay Khimbbapa temple kukasvada
 Jay Bhavani Maa Temple Kukasvada
 Ramapir Temple, Gotana
 Bajrag Bali Temple, Gotana

References 

Villages in Junagadh district